Yalla was a journal focusing on humanizing the Israeli–Palestinian conflict by encouraging creative expression. It was collaboration between young Canadian Arabs and Jews, distributed worldwide. Yalla published two journals, in 2005 and 2007.

The Yalla project was a not-for-profit international initiative aimed at stimulating dialogue and demonstrating the human side of the Israeli-Palestinian conflict from the perspective of mainly Jewish and Arab youth. The project began as a literary journal by students at McGill University in 2004.  Yalla brought together poetry, short stories, essays, art, music and photography of Arab and Jewish youth.

The title of the journal is derived from the Arabic origin slang word "Yalla" (also spelled “Yallah”) (Arabic:يلا), meaning "Let's Go!"

References

External links
Official website Yalla Official website

Online magazines published in Canada
Defunct literary magazines published in Canada
Canadian literature websites
Magazines established in 2004
Magazines disestablished in 2009
Magazines published in Montreal
Magazines published in Toronto
McGill University
Non-governmental organizations involved in the Israeli–Palestinian conflict
Online magazines with defunct print editions